Troymaine D. Pope (born November 29, 1993) is an American football running back. He played college football at Jacksonville State. He has also been a member of the Seattle Seahawks, New York Jets, Indianapolis Colts, Houston Texans, Los Angeles Chargers and Tampa Bay Buccaneers.

Professional career

Seattle Seahawks
Pope signed with the Seattle Seahawks as an undrafted free agent in 2016.

New York Jets
Pope was released by the Seahawks on September 3, 2016, and claimed off waivers by the New York Jets the next day. He was released by the Jets on November 1, 2016.

Seattle Seahawks (second stint)
Pope was signed to the Seattle Seahawks practice squad on November 3, 2016. He was promoted to the active roster on November 15, 2016. He was placed on injured reserve on December 13, 2016, with an ankle sprain. He was waived by the team on May 31, 2017.

Indianapolis Colts
On June 15, 2017, Pope signed with the Indianapolis Colts. He was waived on September 2, 2017. He was re-signed to the practice squad on September 26, 2017, only to be released three days later.

Houston Texans
On November 22, 2017, Pope was signed to the Houston Texans' practice squad. He signed a reserve/future contract with the Texans on January 1, 2018. On September 2, 2018, Pope was waived by the Texans.

Seattle Seahawks (third stint)
On November 6, 2018, Pope was signed to the Seattle Seahawks practice squad. He was released on November 20, 2018.

Los Angeles Chargers
On November 28, 2018, Pope was signed to the Los Angeles Chargers practice squad. On December 13, 2018, Pope was promoted to their active roster. He was waived on January 11, 2019. On January 19, 2019, Los Angeles signed Pope to a reserve/future contract for the 2019 season. Pope made the Chargers 53-man roster in 2019, playing in 14 games primarily on special teams and as a kick returner. He had ten carries for 20 rushing yards to go along with two receptions for 14 receiving yards and one receiving touchdown on the season. On September 18, 2020, Pope was signed to the Chargers practice squad. He was elevated to the active roster on October 12 and 24 for the team's weeks 5 and 7 games against the New Orleans Saints and Jacksonville Jaguars, and reverted to the practice squad after each game. He was promoted to the active roster on October 31. Pope was waived on December 17, 2020, and re-signed to the practice squad two days later. His practice squad contract with the team expired after the season on January 11, 2021.

Tampa Bay Buccaneers
On May 17, 2021, Pope signed with the Tampa Bay Buccaneers. He was waived/injured on August 22, 2021 and placed on injured reserve. He was released on September 2.

Saskatchewan Roughriders 
On May 11, 2022 Christmas signed with the Saskatchewan Roughriders of the Canadian Football League (CFL).

References

External links
Los Angeles Chargers bio
Jacksonville State Gamecocks bio

1993 births
Living people
Sportspeople from Anniston, Alabama
Players of American football from Alabama
American football running backs
Jacksonville State Gamecocks football players
Seattle Seahawks players
New York Jets players
Indianapolis Colts players
Houston Texans players
Los Angeles Chargers players
Tampa Bay Buccaneers players